Fatoumata Diarra (born 15 April 1986) is a Malian international footballer who plays as a forward for AS Mandé and the Mali women's national football team. She competed for Mali at the 2018 Africa Women Cup of Nations, playing in five matches and scoring three goals.

References

1986 births
Living people
Malian women's footballers
Mali women's international footballers
Women's association football forwards
21st-century Malian people